Glattfelden railway station is a railway station in the Swiss canton of Zurich. The station is actually situated in the municipality of Bülach but takes its name from the immediately adjacent municipality of Glattfelden. It is located on the Winterthur to Koblenz line of Swiss Federal Railways, and is served by Zurich S-Bahn line S9 between Zurich and Schaffhausen. A PostBus service (ZVV 540) connects the station with the village.

Services
 the following services stop at Glattfelden:

References

External links
 
 

Glattfelden
Glattfelden
Glattfelden